Wei Boyang was a notable Chinese writer and Taoist alchemist of the Eastern Han Dynasty. He is the author of The Kinship of the Three, and is noted as the first person to have documented the chemical composition of gunpowder in 142 AD. Wei Boyang is considered a semi-legendary figure who represented a "collective unity." The g Qi was probably written in stages from the Han dynasty onward until it approached its current form before 450 AD.

See also
Cantong qi
Chinese Alchemy
History of gunpowder
Taoism

References

Bibliography

Ancient alchemists
Chinese alchemists
Han dynasty science writers
Gunpowder
Han dynasty Taoists
Writers from Shaoxing
Scientists from Shaoxing